The List of awards and nominations received by Arilena Ara refers to the awards and nominations which were received by Albanian singer Arilena Ara.

Kënga Magjike 
 
Kënga Magjike is an annual competition, which has been broadcast every year since its debut in 1999, and the second longest-running television competition in Albania. Arilena Ara has participated for the first time in 2016 and won two awards.

Festivali i Këngës 

Festivali i Këngës is an annual competition, which has been broadcast every year since its debut in 1962, and the longest-running television competition in Albania. Arilena Ara has participated for the first time in 2019 and has won the competition.

Astana Dausy 

|-
|rowspan="2"|2017
|rowspan="2"|"Nëntori"
|Song of the Year 
|
|}

Videofest 

|-
|rowspan="1"|2014
|rowspan="1"|"Aeroplan"
| Best New Artist
|
|}

References 

Ara, Arilena